KQTY-FM (106.7 FM) is a radio station broadcasting a country music format.  Licensed to Borger, Texas, United States, the station is currently owned by Zia Broadcasting Company and features local programming from ABC Radio.

References

External links

QTY-FM
Country radio stations in the United States